The Man Who Killed Hitler and Then the Bigfoot is a 2018 American adventure drama film, written, co-produced and directed by Robert D. Krzykowski in his feature debut, and starring Sam Elliott, Aidan Turner, Larry Miller, Ron Livingston, and Caitlin FitzGerald.

The film debuted at the Fantasia Film Festival in Montreal, Canada, where it premiered on July 20, 2018. The US Premiere took place at the Plaza Classic Film Festival in El Paso, Texas on August 10, 2018. In the UK, it played at FrightFest London on August 26, 2018, in Spain at the Sitges Film Festival and in Finland at the Night Visions Film Festival.

John Sayles and Douglas Trumbull are executive producers. Trumbull also provided special effects.

Plot
Set in 1987, the story is about Calvin Barr (Sam Elliott), an old man living his last days in his quiet hometown with his dog. Barr reminisces about his past with flashbacks showing that during World War II, he served as a special ops soldier on a mission to assassinate Adolf Hitler, which he pulls off successfully, however the operation was classified and never revealed to the public. Barr grew bitter over the years due to feeling like his mission was ultimately pointless as the Nazis weren't decapitated with no leadership, simply finding a convincing body double and actor to replace Hitler and continuing on. As Barr goes about his day-to-day routine, which includes visiting his brother Ed (Larry Miller) in his barbershop, he fights off a gang of thugs who try to steal his car and is followed around by a pair of mysterious men in a government car. The men eventually approach him identifying themselves as joint American and Canadian government agents. They explain that all life on Earth may be coming to an end as a strange virus has been killing people and animals in the Canadian wilderness and the original source of the virus is Bigfoot itself. Knowing Barr is a highly trained tracker and survivalist, and one of the few people on Earth immune to the virus, the agents try to recruit him to go into the wilderness and kill the Bigfoot in hopes it will end the epidemic.

Barr hunts the Bigfoot, wounding him. After much tracking, he finds the Bigfoot dying. Feeling pity for it, Barr chooses to burn the body rather than turn it over to the government, but the Bigfoot is still alive and then attacks Barr, maiming him. The two fight until Barr stabs the Bigfoot and ultimately shoots him to death. Barr lies back, seemingly dying from his wound.

The screen fades to Barr's funeral as his brother gives a beautiful eulogy. Time passes and Ed goes fishing with Barr's dog. Secretly alive, Barr reappears and the two go fishing together. Having achieved a great success in stopping the potential epidemic, Barr finally feels fulfilled in life.

Barr later digs up his casket to retrieve an old box and walks home; the box's contents are never revealed.

Cast
 Sam Elliott as Calvin Barr
 Aidan Turner as Young Calvin Barr
 Caitlin FitzGerald as Maxine
 Sean Bridgers as Mr. Gardner
 Ron Livingston as Flag Pin
 Ellar Coltrane as "The Clerk"
 Larry Miller as Ed
 Rizwan Manji as Maple Leaf
 Mark Steger as the Bigfoot
 Aubrey Hale as Rufus

Production
Filming took place from August to September 2017 in Western Massachusetts, particularly Turners Falls.

Reception

Critical response
The website's critical consensus reads: "The Man Who Killed Hitler and Then the Bigfoot just about lives up to the wild promise of its title, due in no small part to Sam Elliott's world-weary work in the title role." On Metacritic, the film has a weighted average score of 51/100, based on 13 critics, indicating "mixed or average reviews".

References

External links

2018 films
2010s adventure drama films
American adventure drama films
American nonlinear narrative films
Bigfoot films
Films about Adolf Hitler
Films set in the 1980s
Films shot in Massachusetts
2018 drama films
Montague, Massachusetts
2010s English-language films
2010s American films